is a song by Japanese pop singer Takanori Nishikawa featuring ASCA. It was released on May 27, 2020. It reached number 7 on Oricon and number 45 on Japan Hot 100. It was used as the opening theme song for the anime White Cat Project: Zero Chronicle.

Release

On 27 January 2020, Colopl revealed that Takanori Nishikawa and ASCA would perform  as opening theme song for the opening theme song for the anime White Cat Project: Zero Chronicle. The song was released as a single on 27 May 2020 on three edition; Regular edition, Limited edition and Limited anime edition. The single reached number 7 on Oricon, 45 on Japan Hot 100, and 11 on Japan Hot Animation.

Music video
The music video for "Tenbin -LIBRA- " was directed by A.T. The video features Takanori Nishikawa and ASCA singing with black and white effect. Sometimes scene show Takanori Nishikawa doing backflip and super jump with black effect. Also, some scene show that Takanori Nishikawa hold fire with red effect, while ASCA hold fire with blue effect.

Track listing
All tracks written by RUCCA from Elements Garden.

Regular edition

Limited edition

Limited anime edition

Charts

Release history

References

2020 singles
Anime songs
2020 songs